Fung Tsui is one of the 17 constituencies in the North District, Hong Kong. The constituency returns one district councillor to the North District Council, with an election every four years.

Fung Tsui constituency is loosely based on Man Kok Village, Ha Pak Tsuen, Chung Sum Tsuen, Sheung Pak Tsuen, Tai Yuen Tsuen, Hing Yan Tsuen, Po Sheung Tsuen, Wai Loi Tsuen, Mun Hau Tsuen, Hung Kiu San Tsuen and private apartments Sheung Shui Wa Shan and Tsui Lai Garden in Sheung Shui with estimated population of 14,972.

Councillors represented

Election results

2010s

2000s

1990s

References

Sheung Shui
Constituencies of Hong Kong
Constituencies of North District Council
1999 establishments in Hong Kong
Constituencies established in 1999